The 1957–58 Kentucky Wildcats men's basketball team represented University of Kentucky. The head coach was Adolph Rupp. The team was a member of the Southeast Conference and played their home games at Memorial Coliseum. This squad was often nicknamed the "Fiddlin' Five".

Roster

Schedule and results

NCAA Championship
The 1958 NCAA Championship game was played in Louisville, Kentucky, before a then NCAA finals record crowd of 18,803, at the newly completed Freedom Hall. Seattle was Kentucky's opponent, led by the great Elgin Baylor. Baylor, a Consensus First Team All-American, was the nation's second-leading scorer (32.5) behind Cincinnati's Oscar Robertson (35.1).

The Chieftains led Kentucky by 11 points in the first half on two occasions. In fact, Seattle was still leading by a score of 60–58 with seven minutes to go in the game. However, led by the sharp shooting of Vernon Hatton and Johnny Cox, Kentucky mounted a strong rally at the end, eventually winning the game by a final score of 84-72. Hatton led Kentucky with 30 points, Cox followed him with 24 points for the Wildcats, while Seattle was led by Baylor, who scored 25 points before fouling out. The victory sealed Kentucky's 4th NCAA Championship.

Statistics
Vernon Hatton 17.1 ppg
Johnny Cox 14.9 ppg
John Crigler 13.6 ppg
Adrian Smith 12.4 ppg
Ed Beck 5.6 ppg

Awards and honors
Johnny Cox
All-SEC (1st Team – Coaches, 2nd Team – AP)
All-NCAA Regional Team
All-NCAA Final Four Team

John Crigler
All-SEC (3rd Team – AP)

Adrian Smith
All-American (1st Team – Converse, Helms)
All-SEC (1st Team – Coaches, 2nd Team – AP)
All-NCAA Regional Team
All-NCAA Final Four Team

Team players drafted into the NBA

References

Kentucky Wildcats men's basketball seasons
Kentucky Wildcats
NCAA Division I men's basketball tournament championship seasons
NCAA Division I men's basketball tournament Final Four seasons
Kentucky
1957 in sports in Kentucky
1958 in sports in Kentucky